Johnny Cash The King and Tammy Wynette The Queen is an album by American country singers Johnny Cash and Tammy Wynette, released on Columbia Records in 1969, with a second release in 1973 (see 1973 in music). It is a Columbia Musical Treasury featuring two LPs from each artist.

Track listing
A1 	Johnny Cash  -  	I Walk The Line 		
A2 	Johnny Cash  -  	Green, Green Grass Of Home 		
A3 	Johnny Cash  -  	Five Feet High And Rising 		
A4 	Johnny Cash  -  	The Sons Of Katie Elder 		
A5 	Johnny Cash  -  	Happiness Is You 		
B1 	Johnny Cash  -  	The Ballad Of Boot Hill 		
B2 	Johnny Cash  -  	Don't Take Your Guns To Town 		
B3 	Johnny Cash  -  	Folsom Prison Blues 		
B4 	Johnny Cash  -  	Girl In Saskatoon 		
B5 	Johnny Cash  -  	The Long Black Veil 		
C1 	Tammy Wynette  -  	D-I-V-O-R-C-E 		
C2 	Tammy Wynette  -  	Set Me Free 		
C3 	Tammy Wynette  -  	Your Good Girl's Gonna Go Bad 		
C4 	Tammy Wynette  -  	My Elusive Dreams   (Vocals - David Houston)  		
C5 	Tammy Wynette  -  	Kiss Away 		
D1 	Tammy Wynette  -  	I Don't Wanna Play House 		
D2 	Tammy Wynette  -  	It's All Over (Vocals - David Houston)		
D3 	Tammy Wynette  -  	Don't Make Me Now		
D4 	Tammy Wynette  -  	Take Me To Your World 	
D5 	Tammy Wynette  -  	I Stayed Long Enough

Charts

Johnny Cash albums
Tammy Wynette albums
1973 albums
Columbia Records albums